The Community of Christ Stone Church (known from 1888 to 2000 as the RLDS Stone Church) is a historic place of worship at 1012 West Lexington Avenue in Independence, Missouri, United States. The limestone building is north across the street from the Church of Christ (Temple Lot) headquarters and diagonally opposite the Community of Christ Temple.

The Church began construction on the site in 1884, and the completed building was dedicated on April 6, 1888. From the early 1900s until the dedication of the Community of Christ Auditorium in 1958, the Stone Church was the headquarters building of the RLDS Church. Administrative offices and General Conference meetings were transferred in 1958 to the Auditorium, and in 1994 to the Temple after 1994. The structure is still in use today as a regular congregational meeting location and community outreach programs.

References

External links

Official Website, stone-church.org

Religious buildings and structures of the Community of Christ
Churches in Independence, Missouri
Temple Lot
19th-century Latter Day Saint church buildings
Churches completed in 1888
Stone churches in the United States